Arzu Şahin (born September 9, 1978) is a Turkish folk singer.

Biography
Şahin was born in Erzincan in 1978, but when she was young her family moved to Istanbul where she was raised. Şahin spent four years taking private singing lessons before her debut album Ceylanım. Şahin released her second album Ayrılık (Separation). In this album, the contributions of Kıvırcık Ali are enormous. Şahin is married to Abidin Biter and they have two sons.

Discography
 1999: Ceylanım
 2002: Ayrılık
 2004: Düet
 2005: Sus
 2008: Ne Fayda
 2012: Ve... Aşk

References

1978 births
Living people
People from Erzincan
Turkish folk singers
21st-century Turkish singers
21st-century Turkish women singers